Romina Manguel is an Argentine radio host, who works in Getap.

Awards
 2013 Martín Fierro Awards: Best female journalist.

References
 

Argentine radio presenters
Argentine women radio presenters
Argentine journalists
Argentine women journalists
Year of birth missing (living people)
Living people
Argentine Jews